Sulfolobus islandicus rod-shaped virus refers to two different species of virus, both members of the genus Rudivirus:

 Sulfolobus islandicus rod-shaped virus 1
 Sulfolobus islandicus rod-shaped virus 2